Peter Connolly may refer to:

 Peter Connolly (Australian judge)
 Peter Connolly (Australian politician)
 Peter Connolly - a criminal convicted of the murder of Christopher Alaneme
 Peter Connolly - the father of Bridget Connolly
 Peter Connolly - a figure in landscape urbanism
 Peter Connolly (footballer)
 Peter Connolly - military history author and artist

See also
Peter Connelly (disambiguation)